The Man Who Turned to Stone (a.k.a. The Petrified Man) is a 1957 American black-and-white horror science fiction film directed by László Kardos and starring Victor Jory, Ann Doran and Charlotte Austin. The screenplay was written by Bernard Gordon under his pen name Raymond T. Marcus.
The Man Who Turned to Stone was released in 1957 on a double bill with another Katzman-produced film, Zombies of Mora Tau.

Plot
Two social workers, Dr. Jess Rogers (Hudson) and Carol Adams (Austin) grow concerned over the number of deaths of young women at a local young women's detention home. The otherwise healthy inmates are dying of heart failure or suicide. The social workers discover that the manager of the detention home is Dr. Murdock (Victor Jory).

Tracy, one of the inmates, discovers a hidden laboratory. The lab is the base of group of unethical doctors who learned a hundred years ago to extend their lives by draining the vitality of others. Without such transfusions, they begin to slowly petrify. They have become the medical staff of doctors at a girls' reform school, assuring a steady supply of vital young bodies to feed upon.

The two social workers begin a quiet investigation, eventually exposing the doctors and their crimes and saving future victims.

Cast
 Victor Jory as Dr. Murdock
 Ann Doran as Mrs. Ford
 Charlotte Austin as Carol Adams
 William Hudson as Dr. Jess Rogers
 Paul Cavanagh as Cooper
 Tina Carver as Big Marge Collins
 Jean Willes as Tracy
 Victor Varconi as Dr. Myer
 Friedrich von Ledebur as Eric (as Frederick Ledebur)
 George Lynn as Dr. Freneau

Production
Written by Hollywood blacklist screenwriter Bernard Gordon, who used the pseudonym Raymond T. Marcus for this picture.

Reception
The Encyclopedia of Science Fiction found the movie covered ground that even at the time of release were already passé. It stated that the movie blends the juvenile delinquency genre with the horror-scifi which helps the movie and that the acting was credible. Variety found the movie a lesser work in the horror genre, adequate to hold the lower half of a double feature.

See also
List of American films of 1957

References

Bibliography
 Warren, Bill. Keep Watching the Skies: American Science Fiction Films of the Fifties, 21st Century Edition. Jefferson, North Carolina: McFarland & Company, 2009, .

External links
 
The Man Who Turned to Stone at the TCM
Man Who Turned to Stone at Variety

1957 films
1950s science fiction films
American science fiction films
1950s English-language films
Films directed by László Kardos
1950s American films